Joachim Kurt Kühn (born 15 March 1944) is a German jazz pianist.

Biography
He was born in Leipzig, Germany. Kühn was a musical prodigy and made his debut as a concert pianist, having studied classical piano and composition, with Arthur Schmidt-Elsey. Influenced by his elder brother, clarinetist Rolf Kühn, he simultaneously got interested in jazz. In 1961, he became a professional jazz musician. With a trio of his own, founded in 1964, he presented the first free jazz in the GDR. In 1966, he left the country and settled in Hamburg. Together with his brother,  he played at the Newport Jazz Festival and recorded with Jimmy Garrison and Aldo Romano for Impulse!.

Kühn has largely lived in Paris since 1968, and worked with Don Cherry, Karl Berger, Slide Hampton, Phil Woods, Michel Portal, Barre Phillips, Eje Thelin, Ray Lema, Hellmut Hattler, and Jean-Luc Ponty. As a member of Pierre Courbois's Association P.C., he turned to electronic keyboards. During the second half of the 1970s, he lived in California and joined the West Coast fusion scene and recorded with Alphonse Mouzon, Billy Cobham, Michael Brecker, and Eddie Gómez.

Having settled near Paris again, he played in an acoustic trio with Jean-François Jenny-Clark and Daniel Humair since 1985. In the summer of 1996, he joined Ornette Coleman for two concerts at the Verona and Leipzig festivals, which opened the way for his Diminished Augmented System. In 2015 he formed the New Joachim Kühn Trio with Chris Jennings and Eric Schaefer.

Discography

As leader/co-leader

As sideman
 Gary Bartz, Lee Konitz, Jackie McLean and Charlie Mariano: Altissimo (Philips, 1973)
 Zbigniew Namyslowski Quartet with Joachim Kühn: Live at Kosmos, Berlin (ITM, 1965)
 The Rolf Kühn Group: The Day After (BASF/MPS, 1972) featuring Phil Woods
 The Rolf Kühn Group: Connection 74 (BASF/MPS, 1974) featuring Randy Brecker 
 Association P.C. (Pierre Courbois) and Jeremy Steig: Mama Kuku (Live) (BASF/MPS, 1974)
 Zbigniew Seifert: Man of the Light (BASF/MPS, 1976) with Cecil McBee, Billy Hart, and Jasper van 't Hof
 Larry Coryell - Catherine - Kühn: Live! (Elektra, 1980)
 Joe Henderson Collective: Black Narcissus (Milestone, 1976)
 Alan Silva: Seasons (BYG, 1971)

References

1944 births
Living people
Jazz fusion pianists
Post-bop pianists
Post-bop composers
German jazz pianists
BYG Actuel artists
Atlantic Records artists
MPS Records artists
ACT Music artists
Avant-garde jazz pianists
Avant-garde jazz composers
21st-century pianists
European Jazz Ensemble members
Label Bleu artists
EmArcy Records artists